Karavan Lyubvi (Russian: Караван Любви; English: "Caravan of Love") is a Soviet musical television film  starring Sofia Rotaru.

History 
The foundation ideas for the film appeared after Sofia Rotaru performed the song "Karavan lyubvi". The song was later (in 1993) included in the album with the same name: Caravan of Love. The musical film became a fruit of joint production of the Main Edition of Musical Programmes of the Central Television and of the theatre studio Club in 1991.

Performed songs 
Sofia Rotaru performed the following songs:

 Karavan lyubvi
 I'm Missing You a Lot
 Snowflake
 Such a Story
 Touch Me
 When the Separation is Closer
 Tea Roses in the Compartment
 Echo

Composer: V. Matestskiy
Lyrics: M. Shabrov, G. Pozhenyan

Episodic roles 
Brass choir ensemble directed by Vladimir Matetskiy
Show — Balley "Todes" (artistic director Alla Duhova)

See also 
 Song Caravan of Love (song)
 Album Caravan of Love (album)

External links 
Filmography of Sofia Rotaru

Ukrainian television films
Ukrainian-language films
Films directed by Sofia Rotaru
1990s Russian-language films
1991 films
Concert films
1990s dance films
Soviet television films
Films about entertainers
1990s musical films
Ukrainian musical films
Soviet musical films
Soviet-era Ukrainian films